Bolivian–South Africa relations are the bilateral relations between Bolivia and South Africa.  South Africa was accredited to Bolivia through its embassy in Lima, Peru until its closure in 2021.

Morales era
In January 2006, Bolivia's then president-elect Evo Morales visited South Africa as part of his round the world tour ahead of taking up the presidency after Bolivia's 2005 elections.  Morales has stated that South Africa's struggle against apartheid was similar to the political struggle in Bolivia.  On July 17–20, 2006 South Africa sent a follow up delegation to Bolivia led by  Minister in the Presidency, Essop Pahad to cooperate and share experiences on constitutional assemblies as well as minerals and energy policies.

President Morales visited South Africa again during the 2010 Soccer World Cup where he met with South African Vice-President Kgalema Motlanthe to discuss enhancing trade and diplomatic relations.

See also  
 Foreign relations of Bolivia
 Foreign relations of South Africa

References 

South Africa
Bilateral relations of South Africa